The Georgia Academy of Arts, Mathematics, Engineering and Sciences, (formerly known as GAMES), is a dual-enrollment early college entrance program created in 1997 and facilitated by the University System of Georgia in the United States. Typically, juniors in high school who meet the base requirements of GPA and SAT/ACT scores may apply and be admitted to the two-year program which is located at the Cochran, Georgia campus of Middle Georgia State University, although rising seniors and exceptional sophomores may also apply. Students at the Georgia Academy receive college-level education with specialization in the fields of the arts, mathematics, engineering and science.  Academy students take a full college course load and can participate in activities such as the Honors Program, Undergraduate Research, and collegiate clubs such as Science Club, Anime Club, Dungeons & Dragons, the PSYCH-KNIGHTS, Model African Union, Mock Mediation and Math Competition.

Students live in residence halls located on the Middle Georgia State University campus in Cochran, interact with faculty, and are given similar status to traditional students within the university. When students complete the program, they are awarded associate's degrees as well as high school diplomas from their former high schools, and can enter a four-year college or university with junior standing.

More than 700 students have been admitted to The Georgia Academy since its inception in 1997, and The Academy counts two Gates Millennium Scholars (2009 & 2014) among its many very successful alumni.

After the Academy 
Following completion of an associate degree from Middle Georgia State University and receiving a high school diploma, Academy alumni have gone on to attend schools such as:

 Agnes Scott College
 Auburn University
 Brenau University
 Brown University
 California Institute of Technology
 Carnegie Mellon University
 Clemson University
 College of Charleston
 Cornell University
 Duke University
 Emory University
 Fisk University
 Florida A&M University
 George Washington University
 Furman University
 Georgetown University
 Georgia Institute of Technology
 Georgia State University
 Howard University
 Illinois State University
 Iowa State University
 Johns Hopkins University
 Loyola University
 Massachusetts Institute of Technology
 Middle Georgia State University
 New York University
 Oglethorpe University
 Pennsylvania State University
 Purdue University
 Rochester Institute of Technology
 Samford University
 Tulane University
 University of Alabama
 University of California
 University of Chicago
 University of Colorado
 University of Florida
 University of Georgia
 University of Miami
 University of Oklahoma Honors College
 University of Pennsylvania
 University of South Carolina
 University of Southern California
 University of Tennessee
 University of Virginia
 U.S. Naval Academy
 Vanderbilt University
 Washington University
 Washington & Lee University
 Yale University

The Georgia Academy Student Creed: 
To Develop our potential in life through our individual, academic, and social endeavors;

To Promote respect, responsibility and maturity by displaying our elite character and integrity to the University and community;

To Live in unity with diversity while fully benefiting from the advantages of The Georgia Academy throughout the rest of our lives.

See also 
 Advanced Academy of Georgia

References

External links
 The Georgia Academy official website 

Gifted education
University System of Georgia